James, North Carolina may refer to:

James City, North Carolina
St. James, North Carolina